Lois Scharf (born August 21, 1934) is an American historian and writer specialized in women's history, family organization, and feminism. She served as the executive director of the National History Day program from 1978 to 1992. Scharf has taught at John Carroll University and Case Western Reserve University.

Career
She received her Bachelor of Arts degree in 1956 from the University of Michigan. After completing a master's degree in 1971 at John Carroll University, she taught there until 1977. She was one of the early researchers into women's history, when women's studies courses began in the 1970s. She completed her PhD in 1977 at Case Western Reserve University with the thesis The Employment of Married Women during the Depression, 1929–1941, studying under David Van Tassel. From 1978 to 1992, she was the executive director of the National History Day program. Van Tassel, recruited Scharf for the post and her job entailed expanding the state-wide History Day project in Ohio to a National program. She was responsible for obtaining grants to fund the program and recruiting state historical organizations to join in the program. Under her leadership the program expanded from 19,000 student participants in the inaugural year of the contest to over 500,000 students in 1991. During the time that she served as executive director, she worked as an adjunct professor and lectured at Case Western Reserve University. She also published articles and reviews expanding the knowledge of women's working conditions, family organization, and feminism in the interwar period. Her book on Eleanor Roosevelt examined the first lady's place in the history of feminism, as though Roosevelt encouraged women to break boundaries, she openly opposed passage of the Equal Rights Amendment.

Selected works

}

References

Citations

Bibliography

1934 births
Living people
Place of birth missing (living people)
John Carroll University alumni
Case Western Reserve University alumni
John Carroll University faculty
Case Western Reserve University faculty
20th-century American women writers
20th-century American historians
American women historians